Christopher "Chris" Alexander Hallam, MBE (31 December 1962 – 16 August 2013) was a Welsh Paralympian and wheelchair athlete. He competed at four Paralympic Games; Stoke Mandeville, England (1984), Seoul, South Korea (1988), Barcelona, Spain (1992) and Atlanta, United States (1996), as well as two Commonwealth Games; Auckland, New Zealand (1990) and Victoria, British Columbia (1994).

Personal history
Born in Derbyshire, Hallam was raised in Cwmbran, South Wales. He attended Llantarnam School, where he became a competitive swimmer, with aspirations of competing for Wales. A motorcycle accident at age 17 (en route to a training session) resulted in him becoming a wheelchair user. After rehabilitation he spent some time living and travelling in South Africa, before returning to the UK and becoming involved in wheelchair sport. He later studied for his undergraduate and MBA degrees at the University of Wales Institute, Cardiff.

In 2002 he became a Winston Churchill Fellow writing his report on the access of disabled people to specialist training equipment and gyms.

In his latter years, he had ill health. He received a successful kidney transplant in 1996 (with a living donation from his father), but was diagnosed with lymphoma in 2011 and received chemotherapy treatment. He died on 16 August 2013, aged 50, and was survived by his parents (John and Anne) and a sister (Julie). Hallam was the subject of episode 1 of the 2019 BBC series Mavericks: Sport's Lost Heroes.

Sporting career
In 1984 he won a gold medal for the 50m breast stroke, but it was on the track and road where he had the biggest impact. He won a bronze medal in the 400m in Seoul, and repeated this in the 100m in Barcelona. During his career he held world records in the 100m and 200m. He twice pushed his way around Wales (in 1987, 1997) with his training partner and fellow Paralympian John Harris, to raise money for a purpose-built wheelchair-accessible training centre at Cyncoed, Cardiff. He won the London marathon twice, and broke the course record both times, in 1985 and 1987. (1985: 2.19.53, and 1987: 2.08.34)

He won the Great North Run on four occasions (1986, 1987, 1989 and 1990). He competed at two Commonwealth Games, in New Zealand (1990), and in Victoria, British Columbia (1994), respectively, as well as World and European Championships. Chris took the bronze medal at the 100m wheelchair race during the 1992 paralympics in Barcelona As an administrator he organised several National events, and was Chairman of the British Wheelchair Racing Association from 1990 to 1992. In his coaching career he worked with several successful British athletes including Rose Hill, the British Record Holder for the marathon, and Dan Lucker who became world junior champion.

References

1962 births
2013 deaths
Athletes (track and field) at the 1988 Summer Paralympics
Athletes (track and field) at the 1992 Summer Paralympics
Athletes (track and field) at the 1996 Summer Paralympics
Athletes (track and field) at the 1990 Commonwealth Games
Athletes (track and field) at the 1994 Commonwealth Games
Welsh male wheelchair racers
Deaths from cancer in the United Kingdom
Deaths from lymphoma
Paralympic swimmers of Great Britain
Swimmers at the 1984 Summer Paralympics
Swimmers at the 1988 Summer Paralympics
Paralympic athletes of Great Britain
Commonwealth Games competitors for Wales
Paralympic gold medalists for Great Britain
Paralympic silver medalists for Great Britain
Paralympic bronze medalists for Great Britain
Alumni of Cardiff Metropolitan University
Members of the Order of the British Empire
Sportspeople from Cwmbran
Place of death missing
People with paraplegia
Paralympic wheelchair racers
Medalists at the 1984 Summer Paralympics
Medalists at the 1988 Summer Paralympics
Medalists at the 1992 Summer Paralympics
Welsh Paralympic competitors
Paralympic medalists in athletics (track and field)
Welsh male swimmers